El Gamoniteiru is a steep mountain road in Asturias, near La Vega-Riosa, in northern Spain. It is considered one of the most demanding climbs in professional road bicycle racing. It was climbed for the first time professionally in a UCI World Tour competition in the 2021 Vuelta a España. The road that gives access to it reaches 1786 meters above sea level, and is the mountain pass with the highest altitude in Asturias.

Stage winners

References

External links 

Altimetry of the climb.

Climbs in cycle racing in Spain
Geography of Asturias
Sport in Asturias